The Automatgevär m/42 (Ag m/42, outside of Sweden commonly known as the AG 42, AG-42 or Ljungman) is a Swedish semi-automatic rifle which saw limited use by the Swedish Army from 1942 until the 1960s.

History
During the Winter War, Finland captured a number of SVT-38 rifles, and at least one found its way to Sweden. The Ag m/42 was designed by Erik Eklund of the AB C.J. Ljungmans Verkstäder company of Malmö, loosely following SVT mechanics around 1941, and entered production at the Carl Gustafs Stads Gevärsfaktori in Eskilstuna in 1942. Some 30,000 rifles were manufactured in all for the Swedish Army.

This was a relatively small number of weapons and the standard infantry rifle remained the 6.5 mm bolt-action m/96 Mauser.

Norwegian "police troops" trained in Sweden during World War II were issued a number of Ag m/42s and brought these rifles to Norway when the Germans surrendered in 1945. These rifles were never modified to the later Ag m/42B version.

After a number of issues had been discovered, including a serious problem with rusting gas tubes, the existing stocks of the rifle were modified between 1953 and 1956, and the reworked rifles were designated Ag m/42B. Modifications included a stainless steel gas tube, two knobs on the breech cover, a new elevation knob for the rear sight, a rubber case-deflector, new magazines and new cleaning rod. The Ag m/42B was replaced in Swedish service in the mid 1960s by the Ak 4 (derived from the Heckler & Koch G3).

In the early 1950s, the Ag m/42B manufacture license was sold to Egypt resulting in the Hakim rifle, which uses the 7.92×57mm Mauser cartridge. Sweden sold the machinery to Egypt and the Hakim was therefore built with the same machine tools used for the Ag m/42B.

After being re-chambered to 7.62 NATO and having its trajectory adjusted, the Ag m/42 was used as a ranging gun on the Swedish anti-tank gun Pansarvärnspjäs 1110 under the designation Inskjutningsgevär 5110.

Madsen tried to license the Ag m/42, but it never got beyond prototype stages.

Swedish troops serving under UNFICYP have used the m/42.

Design
The Ag m/42 is operated by means of a direct impingement gas system, similar to that of the later, French MAS-49 rifle. The Ag m/42 also uses a tilting breech block like the Tokarev SVT-38/SVT-40, the MAS-49 and FN FAL rifles. The Ag m/42 is ammunition specific since it does not have an adjustable gas port or valve to adjust the rifle to various propellant and projectile specific pressure behavior.

The Ag m/42 rear sight has two bullet drop compensation options, one calibrated for spitzer m/41 ammunition and one for round-nose m/94 ammunition. Which one is installed can be seen between the sight screw and the range window. The bullet image (spitzer or round nose bullet) should match the ammunition used. With a hand adjustable elevation screw on the left side of the rear sight can be adjusted for bullet drop in  increments.

Ammo
The Ag m/42 uses the 6.5×55mm cartridge loaded into a removable 10-round box magazine. In practice, however, the magazine usually remained attached to the rifle while it was loaded from the top with five-round stripper clips. Like the British Lee–Enfield and Soviet SVT-40, the Ag m/42's magazine was intended to be removed only for cleaning.

From 1941 onwards Sweden, which remained neutral during World War II, adopted skarp patron m/94 prickskytte m/41 (live cartridge m/94 sniping m/41) ammunition loaded with a  spitzer bullet (D-projectile). Besides a pointed nose the m/41 D-projectile also had a boat tail to further reduce aerodynamic drag and replaced the m/94 ammunition loaded with the m/94 projectile for general use.

From  with m/41 spitzer ammunition, or  m with m/94 round-nose ammunition.

Variants

Ag m/42B
The Ag m/42B is different from the m/42 with a stainless steel gas tube.

Users

: Made under license as Hakim Rifle and Rasheed Carbine.

Non-State Actors
 Official Irish Republican Army

See also
Kg m/40 light machine gun
GRAM 63 battle rifle
FM 1957 battle rifle

References

External links

Semi-automatic rifles
Rifles of Sweden
Gas-operated firearms
6.5×55mm rifles